Barry Craig Bates Hollowell (April 14, 1948 – August 17, 2016) was an Anglican bishop in Canada.  He was the seventh Bishop of Calgary.

Life 
Born in Boston, Massachusetts and educated at Valparaiso University after which he studied theology in the United Kingdom at Cambridge University and Westcott House. He then finished an M.Div. degree at the Episcopal Theological School (Cambridge, Massachusetts). He was ordained a priest in 1974. He was a deacon at All Saints' Chelmsford, Massachusetts and then assistant curate at Christ Church Cathedral, Fredericton, New Brunswick. He was then Anglican chaplain at the University of New Brunswick, rector of  St George's St Catharines and, before his ordination to the episcopate, Archdeacon of Lincoln, Ontario. He resigned from the position of diocesan bishop of the Diocese of Calgary in 2005. Having previously completed master's degrees in both pastoral counselling (Saint Paul University in Ottawa) and in psychology (University of New Brunswick), he pursued doctoral studies and received a PhD in counselling psychology from the University of Calgary in 2012. His dissertation was entitled "The Experience of Spirituality in the Lives of Anglican Gay Men".

References

1948 births
Valparaiso University alumni
Anglican archdeacons in North America
20th-century Anglican Church of Canada bishops
Anglican bishops of Calgary
21st-century Anglican Church of Canada bishops
LGBT Anglican bishops
2016 deaths
Alumni of Westcott House, Cambridge
21st-century LGBT people